The 2013 Stony Brook Seawolves football team represented Stony Brook University in the sport of American football during the 2013 NCAA Division I FCS football season. The Seawolves competed in the Football Championship Subdivision (FCS) as first-year members of the Colonial Athletic Association (CAA). This was the team's eighth season under the helm of Chuck Priore. They played their home games at Kenneth P. LaValle Stadium in Stony Brook, New York and attempted to build on their second straight appearance in the FCS playoffs but missed the playoffs after a 3–5 CAA, 5–6 overall record.

Previous season
Stony Brook won a program record ten games including their first victory over a Football Bowl Subdivision opponent, Army, and a playoff victory over Colonial Athletic Association champion Villanova. The Seawolves advanced to the second round of the FCS playoffs falling to the Montana State Bobcats 16–10. The Seawolves were broadcast/streamed for a record seven games and attendance levels reached record levels with 5,826 average attendance per game.

Before the season

Losses
RB Miguel Maysonet, QB Kyle Essington, WR Kevin Norrell, OL Michael Bamiro, DB Dominick Reyes and Cedrick Moore were among the major losses for the team. Bamiro being an unusual case in which he exhausted his collegiate eligibility but missed the NFL draft while being draft eligible. Maysonet, Norrell, Bamiro, and Moore were among those that signed free agent contracts with NFL teams. Maysonet played a crucial role in Stony Brook's running game being a finalist for the Walter Payton Award.

Broadcasting
The 2013 season brought Stony Brook football to the ESPN Radio Network for the first time ever. ESPN Radio Network will broadcast all Seawolves football games in Long Island as it looks to expand its footprint in the region. Champions Radio Network (ESPN Network in Long Island) broadcast all Seawolves football games across the Island in two frequencies. Stony Brook will have one game displayed on ESPN3 and two games under the NBC network with the possibility of a third one being added on Rivalry week. Additional games streamed online in the Patriot League Sports Network (vs. Colgate) and Stony Brooks own streaming service.

Schedule
Stony Brook joins the Colonial Athletic Association and will be facing eight conference opponents. The Seawolves will play a 12-game schedule, taking advantage of an NCAA rule that allows FBS teams to schedule 12 games in years when the period starting with the Thursday before Labor Day and ending with the final Saturday in November contains 14 Saturdays. Originally, Stony Brook scheduled Boston College for the first week of the season, however, due to a schedule conflict with the ACC, Boston College was forced to drop Stony Brook and picked up Villanova. As a result, Stony Brook scheduled Penn in an organized scrimmage with eleven regular season games.

Game summaries

Rhode Island

Stony Brook will travel to Kingston to open up their 2013 regular season against the Rams. Stony Brook looks to open up the season with a win for the second consecutive season while Rhode Island looks to earn their first victory since 2011 after a win less 2012 campaign. This will be the first ever meeting between both programs.

Buffalo

Stony Brook will travel to Amherst to face off against the Buffalo Bulls for the second time in three years. After a 35–7 loss at Amherst back in 2011, the Seawolves will look to upset their in-state SUNY rivals and even the series. Buffalo leads the all-time series 1–0.

Villanova

What will be an exciting rematch of the first round of the 2012 FCS playoffs. The Seawolves look to win their second game in as many matches against Villanova. As first year members of the CAA, Stony Brook will travel to Villanova Stadium to face-off against the preseason top-picked Wildcats. Stony Brook leads all time series 1–0.

Towson

Bryant

Colgate

New Hampshire

Maine

Richmond

James Madison

Albany

Stony Brook will face Albany, on rivalry week, at Kenneth P. LaValle Stadium renewing a rivalry last played in 2011. Stony Brook and Albany previously played yearly as members of the Northeast Conference until 2007. Arguably the most heated rivalry between state universities in New York, Albany will look to continue its dominance of the series, while Stony Brook looks to extend their series streak after a 31–28 victory in the Football Championship Series playoffs in 2011. Albany leads the all-time series 9–5

Ranking movements

References

Stony Brook
Stony Brook Seawolves football seasons
Stony Brook Seawolves football